Maurice Dunand (4 March 1898 – 23 March 1987) was a prominent French archaeologist specializing in the ancient Near East, who served as director of the Mission Archéologique Française in Lebanon. Dunand excavated Byblos from 1924 to 1975, and published a Byblos syllabary in his monograph Byblia Grammata in 1945.  The Neolithic of Lebanon was divided by Dunand into three stages based on the stratified levels of Byblos. From 1963 onwards, Dunand also thoroughly excavated the site of the Temple of Eshmun near Sidon.

During the Lebanese Civil War Dunand left Lebanon, taking with him his archives, which he left to the University of Geneva, but which were returned to Lebanon in 2010.

Dunand was a native of Loisin, Haute-Savoie, France. He died there in retirement.

Works

Notes

French archaeologists
1898 births
1987 deaths
20th-century archaeologists
Phoenician-punic archaeologists